HMS Achilles was a 60-gun fourth-rate ship of the line of the Royal Navy, built by Barnard and Turner at Harwich to the draught specified by the 1745 Establishment as amended in 1750, and launched in 1757. She was ordered in November 1755.

Career
HMS Achilles was launched on 6 February 1757 at Harwich. Dorsetshire engaged Raisonnable first, followed by Achilles. After sustaining 35 casualties, Raisonnable was taken and later purchased for the Navy as HMS Raisonnable.

On 4 April 1759 Achilles under Samuel Barrington engaged and captured the 60-gun French coastguard vessel  in a two-hour battle. Achilles sustained 2 killed and 23 wounded. Later that year, Achilles was the flagship of Rear-Admiral George Rodney when he sailed to L'Havre on 3 July. The fleet of four 50-gun ships along with five frigates, a sloop and six bomb ketches destroyed landing barges assembled in the harbour for a possible invasion of England. Achilles remained at L'Havre for the rest of the year.

On 28 March 1762 Achilles, along with several other warships and transports carrying 10,000 troops, set sail from Saint Helens to attack the French at Belleisle. The fleet arrived on 7 April. The next day the army attempted a landing under the cover of Achilless guns. The attack was forced back and the army lost 500 soldiers killed, wounded or captured. The army finally landed successfully on 22 April, and besieged the French in Le Palais until the French surrendered on 7 June.

Achilles became the guardship at Portsmouth in 1763. Achilles was hulked in 1782 and sold on 1 June 1784.

References

External links
 

Ships of the line of the Royal Navy
1757 ships
Ships built in Harwich